Santiago Vila Airport  is an airport serving Girardot, a city in the Cundinamarca Department of Colombia.

Accidents and incidents
On 12 December 1982, Douglas C-47A HK-2580 of Transportes Aéreas Latinamericas crashed at Santiago Vila Airport while on a training flight destined to land at Mariquita Airport. One of the four people on board was killed.

See also

Transport in Colombia
List of airports in Colombia

References

External links 
OpenStreetMap - Girardot
OurAirports - Girardot
SkyVector - Girardot

Airports in Colombia
Cundinamarca Department
Buildings and structures in Tolima Department